Le Corbeau is a 1943 French film directed by Henri-Georges Clouzot and starring Pierre Fresnay, Micheline Francey and Pierre Larquey. The film is about a French town where a number of citizens receive anonymous letters containing libelous information, particularly targeting a doctor accused of providing abortion services. The mystery surrounding the letters eventually escalates into violence.

The film caused serious problems for its director after World War II as it had been produced by Continental Films, a German production company established near the beginning of the Occupation of France, and because the film had been perceived by the underground and the Communist press as vilifying the French people. Because of this, Clouzot was initially banned for life from directing in France, but after protests only until 1947. The film was suppressed until 1969. It was remade as The 13th Letter (1951) by Otto Preminger.

Plot
In a small French town identified as "anywhere", anonymous poison pen letters are sent by somebody signing as "Le Corbeau" (the Raven). The letters start by accusing doctor Rémy Germain of having an affair with Laura Vorzet, the pretty young wife of the elderly psychiatrist Dr. Vorzet. Germain is also accused of practising illegal abortions. Letters are then sent to virtually all the population of the town, but keep getting back to the initial victim, Dr. Germain. The situation becomes increasingly serious when a patient of the hospital commits suicide with his straight razor after the Raven writes to him that his cancer is terminal.

Laura Vorzet's sister Marie Corbin, a nurse in the infirmary, becomes a suspect and is arrested, but soon new letters arrive. When one letter is dropped in a church from a gallery, it becomes apparent the Raven must be one of the people seated there at the time. They are gathered to re-write the Raven's letters as dictated by Dr. Vorzet, to compare the handwriting. Germain's lover Denise is suspected when she faints during the dictation, only for Laura to be identified by material found on her blotter.  Germain agrees to sign an order committing Laura as insane; he is called away to attend Denise, who has fallen downstairs, but before he leaves Laura protests she wrote the Raven's first letters before Dr. Vorzet began dictating them, making him the true Raven. Just as the ambulance takes Laura away, Germain returns to find Dr. Vorzet dead at his desk, his throat cut by the cancer patient's mother as he was writing the Raven's final, triumphant letter.

Cast

Production
The film is loosely based on an anonymous letter case that had begun in the town of Tulle, Limousin, in 1917. Anonymous letters had been sent by somebody signing "the eye of the tiger". The first version of the screenplay was written by Louis Chavance shortly after the Tulle letters, years before it was finally produced. The film credits Clouzot for adapting the story himself, and both Clouzot and Chavance for writing the dialogue.

Le Corbeau was produced by Continental Films, which aside from being a German company established during Occupation, was known for making detective films "with a light, even comic tone" and often featuring Pierre Fresnay, who played Germain in this film. Clouzot previously worked with Fresnay on another Continental Films project, The Murderer Lives at Number 21 (1942). Writer Joseph Kessel later criticised the film's Continental origins, noting Le Corbeau was funded by the Germans, and in that context could be seen as a statement on French corruption. Kessel questioned if the film would be made if it were set in Germany.

It was shot at the Billancourt Studios in Paris with location filming around Montfort-l'Amaury. The film's sets were designed by the art director Andrej Andrejew.

Release
Le Corbeau was released in France on September 28, 1943. Although after the war Le Corbeau was banned and leftists supported keeping the ban in place, the film was screened in cineclubs throughout France and often drew thousands of moviegoers.

The film was released on DVD and Blu-ray by The Criterion Collection. This DVD is out of print and the Blu-ray was made available in 2022.

Reception
In 1947, the film was released commercially, with writer Henri Jeanson praising it as a major piece in French cinema, arguing it was repulsive, but, when compared to reality, became nearly romantic. Despite criticising its origins, Joseph Kessel, writing in response to Jeanson, said that Le Corbeau was indisputably a remarkable film.

Writing in 2004, Professor Alan Williams judged Le Corbeau to be "the first classic French film noir", though made before the term film noir was coined. He found low-key humour in the screenplay and also argued it posed "a properly philosophical debate about the effects of the German occupation", comparing the atmosphere created by the Raven's letters to that under Occupation.

One notable legacy of the film was to make "crow" a term for a malicious informant. In 1984, an anonymous letter-writer and phone-caller taunted a young family in Lépanges-sur-Vologne (France). The family's four- year-old son Gregory was abducted and found drowned in the river. The media labelled the anonymous killer (or killers) 'Le Corbeau'. No one has been apprehended for the crime. In 2006, the film enjoyed a resurgence in popularity in Paris after the Clearstream affair, in which anonymous letters accused French politicians of having hidden bank accounts.

See also
Cinema of France
André Andrejew
Murder of Grégory Villemin

References

External links
 
 
 
 Le Corbeau an essay by Alan Williams at the Criterion Collection

1943 films
1940s mystery thriller films
1940s psychological thriller films
French black-and-white films
Film noir
Films directed by Henri-Georges Clouzot
Films set in France
1940s French-language films
French psychological thriller films
Films with screenplays by Henri-Georges Clouzot
Films shot at Billancourt Studios
French mystery thriller films
Continental Films films
1940s French films